DVD player can refer to these following concepts that embrace DVD playback:
DVD player (device)
DVD Player (Windows)
DVD Player (Mac OS)
DVD drive

See also
CD player (precursor to the DVD player, with similarly shaped discs)
Blu-ray player (not to be confused with HD DVD, since both standards employ HD video provisions)